National Defence Fund (NDF) is an Indian Government Institution, set up in the year 1962 to receive voluntary donations for the promotion and welfare of the members of the Indian Armed Forces (including paramilitary forces) and their dependents. Members of the executive committee include the Prime Minister of India—as chairperson, Home Minister, Defence Minister and Finance Minister—Treasurer.  Donations to the National Defence Fund are 100% tax exempt. Donations can be made through an online government portal also.

Income and expenditure 
The income and expenditure of the NDF for the period 2013 to 2019 is as follows (in crore rupees):

Notable contributions 
Osman Ali Khan, Asaf Jah VII, the last Nizam of Hyderabad of the former Hyderabad State, made a donation of 425  kg of gold to the National Defence Fund in 1965.( Hindu 11 NOV 2018)

References

1962 establishments in India
Government agencies of India
Ministry of Defence (India)